Mellow Gold is the third studio album by American musician Beck, released on March 1, 1994, by DGC Records. Critics noted the album's hybrid of various styles including rock, hip hop, folk, blues, psychedelia, and country, as well as ironic, witty lyrics. Its decidedly anti-commercial attitude led to it becoming an unexpected commercial success, peaking at number thirteen in the United States and eventually being certified platinum. As of July 2008, Mellow Gold has sold over 1.2 million copies in the United States.

Background
In a 1994 interview with Rolling Stone, Beck said of the album: The whole concept of Mellow Gold is that it's like a satanic K-tel record that's been found in a trash dumpster, quite matter-of-factly. A few people have molested it and slept with it and half-swallowed it before spitting it out. Someone played poker with it, someone tried to smoke it. Then the record was taken to Morocco and covered with hummus and tabouli. Then it was flown back to a convention of water-skiers, who skied on it and played Frisbee with it. Then the record was put on the turntable, and the original K-Tel album had reached a whole new level. I was just taking that whole Freedom Rock feeling, you understand.

According to the album's liner notes, Mellow Gold was recorded at Carl Stephenson and Rob Schnapf's houses, predominantly utilizing a four-track.

Album cover
The robot on the cover of Mellow Gold was created by artist Eddie Lopez, who made a cameo in the music video for the hit song "Loser". The sculpture was named "Survivor from the Nuclear Bomb". The shot was originally taken in Lopez's garage space by Beck's friend as well as early collaborator Ross Harris. The last image was reshot in a studio where Harris was able to control the environment and also add visual effects to make the cover look more apocalyptic.

Title
The album was originally going to be titled Cold Ass Fashion, sharing its name with an earlier song of Beck's. The final title used, Mellow Gold, was named after a potent strain of California marijuana.

Reception

Mellow Gold received general acclaim from music critics. AllMusic and Rolling Stone gave it five out of five stars (the latter originally giving it only three and a half).

AllMusic critic Stephen Thomas Erlewine wrote, "although his inspired sense of humor occasionally plays like he's a smirking, irony-addled hipster, his music is never kitschy, and his wordplay is constantly inspired." He also wrote, "It's a dizzying demonstration of musical skills, yet it's all tied together by a simple yet clever sense of songcraft and a truly original lyrical viewpoint, one that's basic yet as colorful as free verse."

Guitar World magazine included Mellow Gold in their "Superunknown: 50 Iconic Albums That Defined 1994" list.

Track listing

Samples credits

"Loser"
"I Walk on Gilded Splinters" by Johnny Jenkins
Kill the Moonlight dialogue

"Fuckin with My Head (Mountain Dew Rock)"
 "Save the World" by Southside Movement

"Soul Suckin' Jerk"
 "The Big Beat" by Billy Squier

"Sweet Sunshine"
 "Save the World" by Southside Movement

"Beercan"
 "Hog Leg" by the Melvins
 Care Bears dialogue

Personnel
 Beck – vocals, acoustic guitar, slide guitar, electric guitar, bass, harmonica, synthesizers, percussion, producer
 Mike Boito – organ (track 8)
 Stephen Marcussen – mastering
 Tom Rothrock – producer, mixing
 Rob Schnapf – producer, mixing
 Carl Stephenson – producer, beats, sampling, sitar (track 1)
 Petra Haden – violin (track 12)
 David Harte – drums (tracks 2, 10, 11)
 Rob Zabrecky – bass (track 12)
 Robert Fisher – art direction, design
 Ross Harris – photography
 Mike O'Connor – drums

Additional personnel
 DJ Smash – turntables

Charts

Weekly charts

Year-end charts

Certifications

References

External links
10 Years of Mellow Gold Documentary (retrospective documentary done for anniversary of the album)

Beck albums
DGC Records albums
1994 albums
Albums produced by Tom Rothrock
Albums produced by Rob Schnapf
Geffen Records albums
Albums produced by Beck
Anti-folk albums
Cannabis music